Volutifusus is a genus of sea snails, marine gastropod mollusks in the family Volutidae.

Species
Species within the genus Volutifusus include:

 Volutifusus aguayoi (Clench, 1940)
 Volutifusus piratica (Clench & Aguayo, 1940)
 Volutifusus torrei (Pilsbry, 1937)

References

Volutidae